George Upton (1553–1609) was an English politician.

Biography
He was the son of Geoffrey Upton, deputy receiver to the Bishop of Bath and Wells, of Trelaske, Cornwall and Warminster, Wiltshire.

He was a Member (MP) of the Parliament of England for Wells in 1584 and 1601, and for Bossiney in 1604.

He married twice but left no children.

References

1553 births
1609 deaths
Members of the Parliament of England for Bossiney
English MPs 1584–1585
English MPs 1601
English MPs 1604–1611